This is the list of Space Sheriff Shaider episodes.

Episodes

See also 
 The Space Sheriff Spirits

References 

Metal Hero Series